Ian Davies (born 29 March 1957) is an English former professional footballer who played as a left back. Active in both England and the United States, Davies made nearly 200 career appearances.

Career
Born in Bristol, Davies began his career with the youth team of Norwich City, and made his debut for the senior team in the Football League during the 1973–1974 season. While at Norwich, Davies spent a loan spell in the North American Soccer League with the Detroit Express. After leaving Norwich in 1979, Davies also played in the Football League for Newcastle United, Manchester City, Bury, Brentford, Cambridge United, Carlisle United, Exeter City, Bristol Rovers and Swansea City, before retiring due to injury in 1986.

References

External links

NASL career stats

1957 births
Living people
English footballers
Norwich City F.C. players
Newcastle United F.C. players
Manchester City F.C. players
Bury F.C. players
Gloucester City A.F.C. players
Brentford F.C. players
Cambridge United F.C. players
Carlisle United F.C. players
Exeter City F.C. players
Bristol Rovers F.C. players
Swansea City A.F.C. players
Detroit Express players
English Football League players
North American Soccer League (1968–1984) players
Wales under-21 international footballers
Association football defenders
English expatriate sportspeople in the United States
Expatriate soccer players in the United States
English expatriate footballers
Welsh expatriate sportspeople in the United States
Welsh expatriate footballers